Vallée-Jonction is a municipality in the Municipalité régionale de comté de la Nouvelle-Beauce in Quebec, Canada. It is part of the Chaudière-Appalaches region and the population is 1,864 as of 2021.

In 1881, the Lévis and Kennebec Railway opened a train station between Sainte-Marie and Saint-Joseph-de-Beauce named Beauce-Jonction. When the Quebec Central Railway bought it in 1882, Beauce-Jonction became one of the most important train stations on the Lévis-Sherbrooke line.

In 1900, the parish of L'Enfant-Jésus was constituted, and part of its territory was detached in 1924 to form a village of the same name, but known locally as Beauce-Junction, after the post office opened in 1883. The village changed its name to Vallée-Jonction in 1949. L'Enfant-Jésus and Vallée-Jonction amalgamated in 1989 to form the current municipality.

Geography

Lakes & Rivers
The following waterways pass through or are situated within the municipality's boundaries:
Chaudière River  a river with its source near the Town of Lac-Mégantic.
Morency River a tributary of the east bank of the Chaudière River.

References

Commission de toponymie du Québec
Ministère des Affaires municipales, des Régions et de l'Occupation du territoire

Municipalities in Quebec
Incorporated places in Chaudière-Appalaches